The women's 3000 metres event  at the 1998 European Athletics Indoor Championships was held on 1 March.

Results

References

Results

3000 metres at the European Athletics Indoor Championships
3000
1998 in women's athletics